Fischli is a surname. Notable people with the surname include:

 Paul Fischli (born 1945), Swiss footballer and manager
 Peter Fischli (born 1952), Swiss artist
 Sam Fischli (born 1998), New Zealand rugby union player

See also
 Fischlin